The Yea Chronicle is a weekly newspaper that circulates on Wednesdays throughout the western region of the Murrindindi Shire in Victoria, Australia.

The newspaper started as The Yea Telegraph in October 1885. The name changed to The Yea Chronicle in 1890. An early owner was Frederick G. Purcell. It was later owned by Tom Dignam and who sold the paper to Ash and Fleur Long in 1984 and they in turn sold it to Geoff Heyes and Jenny Smith of Alexandra newspapers in May 1993.  it has a circulation of 524.

See also
 List of newspapers in Australia

References

External links 

Digitised World War I Victorian newspapers from the State Library of Victoria

Newspapers published in Victoria (Australia)
1885 establishments in Australia
Newspapers on Trove
Weekly newspapers published in Australia